Eric Pinkett O.B.E.  (1910–1979), was the founder of the internationally famous Leicestershire Schools Symphony Orchestra. He established the Leicestershire County School of Music in 1948 and continued to conduct the orchestra (as well as being the county's principal music advisor) until his retirement in 1976.

His memoirs were published in 1969 by way of a 21st anniversary tribute to the LSSO in a book called Time to Remember.

A regular visitor to the recording studio, Eric Pinkett conducted works by Havergal Brian, Malcolm Arnold, Bryan Kelly and David Bedford with the LSSO for the CBS, Unicorn, Pye, Argo and Virgin record labels.

During his involvement with musical education in Leicestershire, he was known as "Mr Music".

In April 2007, a new housing development by Rippon Homes was opened in Thurmaston on the site of Eric Pinkett's family home. The new development has been named Symphony Gardens in his honour.

References

External links
Leicestershire Schools Symphony Orchestra website contains articles and a few photographs of Eric Pinkett and also of Sir Michael Tippett, who was the orchestra's patron and conducted them regularly in the UK and Europe. There are also some interesting memorabilia items on this site.
Shires Suite Information and short audio excerpts from various LSSO recordings
Suite in D Information and short audio excerpts from the 1967 Pye recording
Online memoirs

1910 births
1979 deaths
Music promoters